Sultan Gelin is a 1973 Turkish drama film, directed by Halit Refiğ and starring Türkan Soray, Ali Özoğuz, and Handan Adalı.

References

External links

1973 films
Turkish drama films
1973 drama films
Films directed by Halit Refiğ